Country Life (stylized in all caps) is a British weekly perfect-bound glossy magazine that is published by Future plc. It was based in London at 110 Southwark Street until March 2016, when moved to Farnborough, Hampshire. In 2022, the magazine moved back to London at 121 – 141 Westbourne Terrace, Paddington.

History 

Country Life was launched in 1897, incorporating Racing Illustrated. At this time it was owned by Edward Hudson, the owner of Lindisfarne Castle and various Lutyens-designed houses including The Deanery in Sonning; in partnership with George Newnes Ltd (in 1905 Hudson bought out Newnes).

At that time golf and racing served as its main content, as well as the property coverage, initially of manorial estates, which is still such a large part of the magazine. Elizabeth Bowes-Lyon, the late Queen Mother, used to appear frequently on its front cover. Now the magazine covers a range of subjects, from gardens and gardening to country house architecture, art and books, and property to rural issues, luxury products and interiors.

In 1997, the centenary of the magazine was celebrated by a special issue, the publishing of a book by Roy Strong, the broadcast of a BBC2 TV programme on a year in the life of the magazine, and staging a Gold Medal-winning garden at the Chelsea Flower Show. In 1999, the magazine launched a new website.

In 2007, the magazine celebrated its 110th anniversary with a special souvenir issue on 4 January. Since May 2008 the magazine has been issued each Wednesday, having been on sale each Thursday for the past 111 years.

Topics 

The first several dozen pages of each issue are devoted to colour advertisements for upmarket residential property

The magazine covers various aspects of rural life. It is primarily concerned with rural communities and their environments as well as the concerns of country dwellers and landowners and has a diverse readership which, although mainly UK based is also international.

The other rural pursuits and interests covered include hunting, shooting, farming, equestrian news and gardening and there are regular news and opinion pieces as well as rural politics. There are reviews of books, food and wine, art and architecture and antiques and crafts. Illustrative material includes the Tottering-by-Gently cartoon by Annie Tempest.

Recent feature articles have included Charles, Prince of Wales guest-editing an issue of Country Life in 2013, a historic revelation which revealed the true face of Shakespeare for the first time in 2015, and in 2016 an exclusive on where the Great Fire of London began in 1666. There was a special commemorative issue in June 2016 on the occasion of the Queen's 90th birthday.

BBC documentary 
In March 2016, Country Life was featured in a three-part documentary series produced by Spun Gold which aired on BBC2 called Land of Hope and Glory, British Country Life.

Editors 
 James Edmund Vincent 1897–1900
 Peter Anderson Graham 1900–1925
 W E Barber 1925–1933
 Christopher Hussey 1933–1940 (previously Architectural Editor)
 F Whitaker 1940–1958
 John Adams 1958–1973
 Michael Wright 1973–1984
 Marcus Binney 1984–1986 (previously Architectural Editor)
 Jenny Green 1986–1992
 Clive Aslet 1993–2006 (previously Deputy Editor, now Editor-at-Large)
 Mark Hedges 2006–present

Deputy editors:
 Clive Aslet 1989–1993 (previously architectural editor)
 Michael Hall 1998–2004 (previously architectural editor, current editor of Apollo)
 Jessica Fellowes 2004–2008
 Rupert Uloth 2008–2016
 Kate Green 2016–present

Architectural editors [dates as architectural writer]:
 provisionally Edward Hudson and James Edmund Vincent 1897–1900 / Peter Graham 1900–1907
 Henry Avray Tipping 1907–1910, 1916–1930 [1930–1933]
 Sir Lawrence Weaver 1910–1916
 Christopher Hussey 1930–1933, 1940–1964 [1921–1930]
 Arthur Oswald 1933–1940 [1928–1933, 1940–1969]
 Mark Girouard 1964–1967 [c.1958–1964]
 John Cornforth 1967–1977 [c.1960–1967, 1977–c.1990]
 Marcus Binney 1977–1984 [1968–1977]
 Clive Aslet 1984–1989 [1977–1984]
 Giles Worsley 1989–1994 [1985–1988]
 Michael Hall 1994–1998 [1989–1994]
 Jeremy Musson 1998–2007 [1995–1998]
 John Goodall 2007–present

Gardens editors:
 E.T. Cook [early 20th century]
 Tony Venison
 Tim Richardson 1995–1999
 Kathryn Bradley-Hole 2000–2018
 Tiffany Daneff 2018—

(earlier versions cited Fred Whitsey as a gardens editor, but he was a distinguished contributor only,
being in fact the Editor of sister publication Popular Gardening)

Notable contributors 
 Christopher Lloyd (gardening)
 Bernard Darwin (grandson of Charles) (golf 1907–1961)
 Alethea Hayter (fashion editor 1933–38)
 Claude Scudamore Jarvis ("A Countryman's Notes", 1939–53)
 Gertrude Jekyll (gardening)
 Lucinda Lambton (architecture)
 John Martin Robinson (architecture)
 Gavin Stamp (architecture)
 Alistair John Rowan (architecture, before 1967)
 Tim Yeo (politics)
 Christina Broom (photographer)
 Alice Hughes (photographer, cover portraits, 1898-1909)
 Emile Frechon (photographer, rural life, 1902-1915)

Staff architectural photographers:
 Charles Latham c1897–c1909
 Frederick Evans (1853–1945) pre1906-?
 Alfred E. Henson (1885–1972) 1917–57
 Alex Starkey 1953–87 (last staff photographer)

See also
 Country Life books – from the photographic and article archives of Country Life magazine (mostly architectural)
 The Curious House Guest – a 2005–6 TV series by then Architectural Editor Jeremy Musson on visiting country houses

Notes

References
 Country Life, 1897–1997: The English Arcadia, by Sir Roy Strong, Boxtree Ltd, 1996,  (the history of the magazine).
 Fifty Years of Country Life, by Bernard Darwin, Country Life, 1947 (94 pages, on the first 50 year's history of the magazine).
 An Everyday Story of Country Life, BBC2, 1997, being a TV documentary filmed over a one-year period in 1996 at the magazine, to celebrate its centenary.

External links

 Country Life

1897 establishments in the United Kingdom
Lifestyle magazines published in the United Kingdom
Weekly magazines published in the United Kingdom
Magazines published in London
Magazines established in 1897
Rural culture in Europe
Rural society in the United Kingdom